Sinéad McLaughlin is a Social Democratic and Labour Party (SDLP) politician who has served as a Member of the Legislative Assembly (MLA) for  Foyle since January 2020.

McLaughlin was co-opted to the Assembly, following Colum Eastwood’s election as the Member of Parliament (MP) for Foyle in the 2019 UK general election.

She has been the SDLP's Spokesperson for the Economy as well as Spokesperson for COVID-19 recovery, the Chair of the Northern Ireland Assembly's Executive Office Committee and the Deputy Chair of the Assembly's Economy Committee. McLaughlin is a former Chief Executive of the Chamber of Commerce in Derry and was a leader of the campaign in Northern Ireland against Brexit.

McLaughlin was successfully re-elected in the 2022 Assembly election. In her role, McLaughlin focuses on jobs and the economy, particularly in Derry, as well as access to affordable childcare and university expansion in Derry.

References

Living people
Social Democratic and Labour Party MLAs
Female members of the Northern Ireland Assembly
Year of birth missing (living people)
21st-century women politicians from Northern Ireland
Northern Ireland MLAs 2017–2022
Northern Ireland MLAs 2022–2027